Michael D'Antuono is an American contemporary artist whose painting style focuses primarily on socio-political issues. He is best known for his controversial portrait of U.S. President Barack Obama crucified in front of the Presidential seal entitled "The Truth," which twice became a U.S. and international news story.  The UK publication The American called him "one of the world's most controversial artists."

Career 
D'Antuono worked an art director for the New York City advertising agency DMB&B, where he created television campaigns . He also works as a freelance illustrator.

The Truth (2009) 

D'Antuono's painting of United States President Barack Obama titled The Truth, which depicts Obama standing in front of the U.S. Presidential seal wearing a crown of thorns, created a great deal of political controversy. D'Antuono planned to unveil the painting at New York City's Union Square on April 29, 2009, to mark the 100th day of Obama's presidency. The artist canceled the public unveiling due to an outpour of protests by the religious right, including thousands of e-mails, phone calls, and blog posts demanding the planned exhibit be shut down.

The Truth (2012) 

Four years after his initial attempt, D'Antuono was invited to finally publicly display The Truth along with several other of his paintings at Boston's Bunker Hill Community College Art Gallery, as part of their politically charged "Artists on the Stump – the Road to the White House 2012" exhibition. This created another firestorm of controversy. Catholic League for Religious and Civil Rights president Bill Donahue and former GOP presidential candidate Herman Cain were among those who vehemently denounced the painting. Glenn Beck devoted two shows to discuss and defend D'Antuono's First Amendment right to exhibit his work.

Other paintings 

D'Antuono has focused on several socio-political issues with his other paintings.

His piece inspired by the Trayvon Martin tragedy, A Tale Of Two Hoodies, created a great deal of public discourse concerning the racism faced by African American youth.

Taking aim at the Republican opposition to congressional tax increases, D’Antuono created Who the Hell Is Grover Norquist? in 2012. The work candidly shows the power Oz-like Norquist, the founder and president of Americans for Tax Reform, has over the Republican Party.

D'Antuono has also done provocative pieces on corporate influence, dependence on foreign oil, media bias, immigration, outsourcing, Citizens United, and other hot-button issues.

Inspiration 

D'Antuono displays the Picasso quote "Art is not meant to decorate rooms. It is an offensive weapon in the defense against the enemy" directly under his name in the header of his website. In interviews, D’Antuono indicated that the purpose of his art is to challenge people to think more deeply about socio-political issues.

References 

American political satire
21st-century American painters
21st-century American male artists
Living people
Year of birth missing (living people)
Place of birth missing (living people)
Painters from New York (state)